Simon Finn may refer to:

 Simon Finn (politician), Australian Labor Party politician
 Simon Finn (musician), English psych rock musician